Serhiy Sapronov (born in Chernihiv, December 29, 1953) is a retired Soviet football player and Ukrainian coach. He spent most of his career to Desna Chernihiv the main club in Chernihiv.

Career
Serhiy Sapronov, started his career Desna Chernihiv, from the season 1979 until 1984, where he played 85 games and scored 31 goals. He made his debut for his new team on May 3, 1999 in a home match of the national championship between Chernihiv's Desna and Zaporizhia's Torpedo. In that match, the hosts lost 0: 3. Oleksandr came on in the 46th minute of the match instead of Petro Pylypeiko, but in the 65th minute he was replaced by Vadym.

As coach
After completing his performances, he worked for some time as an assistant to the head coach of Desna, and from 2002 to 2005 he headed the amateur football club Nizhyn. During 2005-2007 he worked as a trainer-teacher of the Sports School of the FSO "Spartak". In 2008, he was appointed head coach of the Lehenda-Chernihiv women's football club. He won gold medals of the Ukrainian Championship twice in a row with the club (2009, 2010) and twice brought silver to Chernihiv. In 2009, the Legends footballers made a golden double, adding the Ukrainian Cup to the championship. Due to the unsuccessful start of the team in the 2012 championship, Sergei Sapronov was dismissed from the post of the head coach of Legends of his own free will 

In 2013, he was appointed as Ukraine (women under 15).

In 2019 he has been appointed as coach of Zhytlobud-1 Kharkiv.

Honour

As Player 
Desna Chernihiv
 Ukrainian Second League: 1996-97
Championship of the Ukrainian SSR: Runner-up 1982

Zirka Kropyvnytskyi
 Ukrainian First League: 1994-95

Nyva Vinnytsia
 Ukrainian First League: 1992-93

As Coach 
Lehenda Chernihiv
 Ukrainian Women's League: 2009, 2010
 Women's Cup: 2009

References

External links 
Profile on website 

1953 births
Living people
Footballers from Chernihiv
Soviet footballers
Ukrainian footballers
SDYuShOR Desna players
FC Desna-3 Chernihiv players
FC Desna Chernihiv players
FC CSKA Kyiv
FC Nyva Vinnytsia players
NK Veres Rivne players
FC Zirka Kropyvnytskyi players
FC Bukovyna Chernivtsi players
FC Desna Chernihiv managers
WFC Zhytlobud-1 Kharkiv managers
WFC Lehenda-ShVSM Chernihiv managers
Female association football managers
Association footballers not categorized by position